New Mexico State Road 26 (NM 26) is a  paved, two-lane state highway in Luna, Sierra, and Doña Ana counties in the U.S. state of New Mexico. It travels southwest-to-northeast largely following the main trunk of the ATSF railroad.

The western terminus of NM 26 is at intersection with US 180 north of Deming. The eastern terminus is north of Hatch at the interchange with I-25. NM 26 is an important connecting road between I-10 and I-25 west of Las Cruces. In the vicinity of Deming NM 26 is also known as Hatch Highway.

Route description
The highway begins just north of Deming at the intersection with US 180. For the first 3.25 miles the road travels mostly east-northeast until it closes in with the ATSF railroad trunk. From that point on the highway turns northeast and follows the railroad track. The road travels through the Chihuahuan Desert with southern slopes of Cooke's Range mountains skirting from the north. At approximately 14 mile mark Cooke's Peak, named after Captain Philip St. George Cooke, and the tallest mountain in the Cooke's Range, can be seen to the north of the highway. At 14.45 miles NM 26 intersects with CR A019 (Cooke's Canyon Rd) providing access to Cooke's Canyon, Cooke's Spring and Fort Cummings historic site. At 22.53 miles wind turbines can be seen to the north of NM 26 which are part of the Macho Springs Wind Farm built in 2011 and generating 50 MW of windpower. After  NM 26 intersects with NM 27 in a ghost town of Nutt and changes direction to slightly more easterly. After about a mile, NM 26 reaches community of Placitas where it intersects with NM 187 turning eastward. Travelling through Hatch NM 26 meets with NM 185  further and turns north at the intersection. At  NM 26 crosses the Rio Grande river over a  bridge, built in 1965, and arrives at its northeastern terminus  later.

History
NM 26 contains sections of the original Routes 26 and 27 created in 1905 by the Territorial Legislative Assembly. It contains a segment of the old Route 26 from Deming to Nutt and a stretch from Nutt to Hatch which was the original Route 27. During early 1940s Route 26 was re-routed towards Hatch, and the road to Hillsboro became Route 27. On 1927 map Route 26 is shown as a "first class" road between Deming and Hillsboro while a stretch between Nutt and Hatch is shown as "third class" road. On 1938 map both Routes 26 and 27 shown as "graded" and 1941 map shows both stretches of Route 26 and 27 as having "oil and concrete" surface. By 1950s the entire road was paved.

Major intersections

See also

 List of state roads in New Mexico

References

External links

 

026
Transportation in Luna County, New Mexico
Transportation in Sierra County, New Mexico
Transportation in Doña Ana County, New Mexico